Love is the second studio album by English rock band the Cult, released on 18 October 1985 by Beggars Banquet Records. The album was the band's commercial breakthrough, reaching number four in the UK and staying on the chart for 22 weeks. It produced three Top 40 singles in the UK, "She Sells Sanctuary", "Rain", and "Revolution". It has been released in nearly 30 countries and sold an estimated 2.5 million copies. Love was recorded at Jacob's Studios in Farnham, Surrey, in July and August 1985.

Background
Many European CD pressings, as well as Canadian and Australian pressings, include two bonus tracks: "Little Face" as track four, and "Judith" as track eleven. Various other foreign pressings have several other bonus tracks. For unknown reasons, the Korean vinyl and cassette tape editions omitted the songs "Big Neon Glitter" and "Revolution". Also inexplicably, in the Philippines a considerably shorter version of the song "Brother Wolf; Sister Moon" was used; it lasts only 5:18, omitting most of the guitar solos in the second half of the song.

In 2000, the album was remastered and reissued on CD, with only the ten original songs and different artwork. "Big Neon Glitter" and "Hollow Man" are alternately listed with and without the article "The" in their title, respectively.

In 2003, the record was issued on CD in Russia, Belarus and Lithuania, formerly being available only as a bootleg LP in the Soviet Union. These 2003 Eastern European releases came with the bonus tracks "Faith Healer" and "Edie (Ciao Baby)" (acoustic) as tracks 13 and 14, and the word acoustic is misspelled as ""; the pressings also use a different font for the lettering. There is also an Indonesian cassette tape version which rearranges the track listing, and includes "Dreamtime" and "Bad Medicine Waltz", from the previous Cult record, Dreamtime.

To coincide with the band's Love Live Tour in August 2009, the band released two different editions of the album:

 Version one is the "Expanded Edition", a 2-CD set consisting of the album on one disc as well as extended versions of album cuts, remixes and b-sides on the second disc. This set was released on 8 August 2009 in Varada and the USA, and 21 September in Europe.
 Version two is called the "Omnibus Edition" which features the first two discs from the "Expanded Edition" plus two more discs. Disc three features demos from the Love album presented for the first time, and disc four features a live concert recorded by the BBC at the Hammersmith Odeon in London on 31 October 1985.

Track listing

Original 1985 release
All songs written by Ian Astbury and Billy Duffy.

2009 "Expanded edition" CD 2 track listing
"She Sells Sanctuary" (Long version) – 6:59
"No. 13" – 4:40
"The Snake" – 8:09
"(Here Comes the) Rain" – 6:19
"Little Face" – 4:54
"Revolution" (Full length remix) – 5:29
"Judith" – 5:29
"Sunrise" – 5:11
"All Souls Avenue" – 4:45
"She Sells Sanctuary" (Howling mix) – 8:26
"Assault on Sanctuary" – 7:31

Omnibus edition CD 3 and 4 track listings

CD 3: "The Demos"
"Brother Wolf, Sister Moon" – 7:54
"Hollow Man" – 5:48
"She Sells Sanctuary" – 5:21
"All Souls Avenue" – 4:56
"Little Face" – 5:45
"No. 13" – 6:23
"Big Neon Glitter" – 6:34
"Waltz" (Instrumental) – 4:36
"Nirvana" (Instrumental) – 6:04
"Revolution" (Instrumental) – 6:50
"She Sells Sanctuary" (Olympic mix) – 7:04

CD 4: Live at the Hammersmith Odeon, 31 October 1985
"Love" – 5:54
"Nirvana" – 5:05
"Christians" – 4:33
"Hollow Man" – 5:01
"Big Neon Glitter" – 4:46
"Brother Wolf, Sister Moon" – 7:01
"Rain" – 5:12
"Dreamtime" – 3:10
"She Sells Sanctuary" – 5:35
"Go West" – 5:02
"Spiritwalker" – 4:35
"Horse Nation" – 3:17
"The Phoenix" – 5:19

Bonus tracks/international releases
"Little Face" (bonus track, track four in some territories)
"Judith" (bonus track, track eleven in some territories)
"Faith Healer" (bonus track, track thirteen in Eastern Europe and Asia)
"Edie (Ciao Baby)" (acoustic version) (bonus track, track fourteen in Eastern Europe and Asia)
Indonesian cassette tape versions:
 Side A: Love, She sells Sanctuary, Rain, Nirvana, Revolution, Black Angel.
 Side B: The Phoenix, The Hollow Man, Big Neon Glitter, Brother Wolf Sister Moon, Dreamtime*, Bad Medicine Waltz*. *From the album Dreamtime.
On these Indonesian pressings, the song "Brother Wolf Sister Moon" is incorrectly listed as "Brother Walf Sister Moon", and drummer Nigel Preston is listed as Nigel Reston.

Saudi Arabian cassette tape versions includes "Spiritwalker/Dreamtime/Rider in the Snow/A Flower in the Desert" as bonus tracks, but it does not include "Judith" or "Little Face". An alternate Saudi Arabian version includes only nine of the original ten songs, omitting Revolution and comes with a different sleeve.

2009/2010 Love Live Tour
In 2009 and 2010, The Cult played the Love album in its entirety during an extended tour. The setlist typically was formatted as follows.
"Nirvana"
"Big Neon Glitter"
"Love"
"Brother Wolf, Sister Moon"
"Rain"
"The Phoenix"
"Hollow Man"
"Revolution"
"She Sells Sanctuary"
"Black Angel"
Encore:
"Electric Ocean"
"Wild Flower"
"Illuminated" (later replaced with "Sun King")
"Rise"
"Fire Woman"
"Dirty Little Rockstar"
"Love Removal Machine"

Personnel
The Cult
Ian Astbury – lead vocals and backing vocals
Billy Duffy – guitars and backing vocals 
Jamie Stewart – bass and backing vocals
Additional personnel
Mark Brzezicki – drums on all tracks except "She Sells Sanctuary", "No. 13" and "The Snake"
Simon Kliney – Fairlight
Nigel Preston – drums on "She Sells Sanctuary", "No. 13" and "The Snake"
The Soultanas (Mae McKenna, Lorenza Johnson, Jackie Challenor) – backing vocals on "Rain", "Revolution" and "The Phoenix".

References

The Cult albums
1985 albums
Beggars Banquet Records albums
Sire Records albums